Cae Gwernllertai is a Site of Special Scientific Interest in Brecknock, Powys, Wales. It is designated for acid
grassland, marshy grassland, semi-natural woodland and wet heath.

See also
List of Sites of Special Scientific Interest in Brecknock

Sites of Special Scientific Interest in Brecknock